Theological aesthetics is the interdisciplinary study of theology and aesthetics, and has been defined as being "concerned with questions about God and issues in theology in the light of and perceived through sense knowledge (sensation, feeling, imagination), through beauty, and the arts". This field of study is broad and includes not only a theology of beauty, but also the dialogue between theology and the arts, such as dance, drama, film, literature, music, poetry, and the visual arts.

Notable theologians and philosophers that have dealt with this subject include Augustine of Hippo, Thomas Aquinas, Martin Luther, Jonathan Edwards, Søren Kierkegaard, Karl Barth, Hans Urs von Balthasar, and David Bentley Hart among others.

Theological aesthetics has recently seen rapid growth as a subject for discussions, publications, and advanced academic studies.

Aesthetics in Christian theology

The early church
Theological writings during the period of the early Christian church which deal with aesthetics span from circa 160 to c. 650 and include writings by Justin Martyr, Irenaeus, Origen, Augustine of Hippo, Pseudo-Dionysius, Gregory of Nyssa, and Maximus the Confessor, among others. Prevalent themes during this period included "the vision of God or of God's glory, the image of God in Christ and in us, and the concern with idol worship".

The medieval church
During the Middle Ages, Western theologians such as Anselm of Canterbury, John Scotus Eriugena, Bonaventure, Thomas Aquinas, Nicholas of Cusa, and Bernard of Clairvaux touched upon themes such as "the idea of beauty, the vision of God, the image of Christ, the iconodule-iconoclast conflict, and the strong presence of personally grounded and poetic doxologies".

The Reformation
Concerning aesthetics, the theologians of the 16th century Protestant Reformation (Martin Luther, Jean Calvin, and Huldrych Zwingli) dealt primarily with "the theology of the image, in particular, idolatry and iconoclasm".

The 17th–19th centuries
Theological aesthetics increased in diversity during this period, with activity such as "the composition of hymns in Protestant circles, Edwards' writing on beauty, the Romantic artists and intellectuals with their panentheist sensibilities, Schleiermacher's idea of religion as feeling and intuition, the decline of religious art, and the ground-breaking philosophical contributions of thinkers such as Burke, Baumgarten, Kant and Hegel."

The 20th century
Some major themes which emerged and developed in the 20th century included the question of "how art can function as a source of and in theology" (Tillich, Rahner, Dillenberger), the question of "the art work as a shaper of meaning in today's culture" (Burch Brown, Cox, Küng), "the essential role of imagination in theology" (Lynch, McIntyre, Green), and the beauty of God (van der Leeuw, Barth, von Balthasar). Rookmaaker helpfully sought to provide a reformed Christian critique of art and aesthetics in the cultural and political upheavals of the 1960s in his book 'Modern Art and the Death of a Culture'.

Present day

Academic programs

Graduate studies

Andover Newton Theological School  - Newton Centre, MA
 Master of Arts in Theology and the Arts
Dallas Theological Seminary  - Dallas, TX
 Master of Arts in Media and Communication
 Master of Theology with ministry track in Media and Communication
Dominican School of Philosophy and Theology  - Berkeley, CA
 Master of Arts in Art and Religion
Duke Divinity School  - Durham, North Carolina, USA
Master of Divinity - Theology and the Arts course
Fuller Theological Seminary  - Pasadena, California, USA
 Master of Arts in Theology - Theology and the Arts Format
 Master of Arts in Worship, Theology, and the Arts
Graduate Theological Union  - Berkeley, CA
 Master of Arts in Art and Religion
Huron University College  - London, Ontario, Canada
 Master of Arts in Theology
King's College London  - London, England, United Kingdom
 Master of Arts in Christianity and the Arts (Theology)
Regent College  - Vancouver, British Columbia, Canada
 Master of Christian Studies (with an option for an arts thesis)
Southern Baptist Theological Seminary  - Louisville, Kentucky, USA
 Master of Arts in Theology and Arts 
Union Theological Seminary  - New York, NY
 Master of Arts in Theology and the Arts
United Theological Seminary of the Twin Cities  - New Brighton, MN
 Master of Arts in Theology and the Arts
Wesley Theological Seminary  - Washington, DC
 Master of Divinity, Master of Theological Studies, and Master of Arts with Certificate in Theology and the Arts
Yale Divinity School - New Haven, CT
 Master of Arts in Religion concentrated in Religion and the Arts
Yale Institute of Sacred Music - New Haven, CT
Master of Arts in Religion concentrated in Religion and the Arts

Postgraduate studies
Duke Divinity School  - Durham, North Carolina, USA
ThD Concentration in the Arts
Fuller Theological Seminary  -Pasadena, California, USA
PhD in Theology and Culture
Graduate Theological Union  - Berkeley, CA, USA
 PhD in Art and Religion
Southern Baptist Theological Seminary  - Louisville, KY, USA
 PhD in Christianity and the Arts 
University of St. Andrews  - The Institute of Theology, Imagination, and the Arts, St. Andrews, Scotland
 PhD research program
University of Chicago Divinity School  - Chicago, Illinois, USA
PhD in Religion and Literature
Wesley Theological Seminary  - Washington, DC, USA
DMin in Religion and the Arts

See also
Cultural depictions of Jesus
Christian worship
Iconography

References

Further reading
Begbie, Jeremy. Beholding the Glory: Incarnation through the Arts. London: Darton, Longman, and Todd, 2000.
Begbie, Jeremy. Sounding the Depths: Theology through the Arts. London: SCM Press, 2002.
Begbie, Jeremy. Theology, Music, and Time. Cambridge: Cambridge University Press, 2000.
Begbie, Jeremy. Voicing Creation’s Praise: Towards a Theology of the Arts. Edinburgh: T&T Clark, 1991.
de Borchgrave, Helen. A Journey Into Christian Art. Oxford: Lion Publishing, 1999.
Brown, David. Divine Generosity and Human Creativity: Theology through Symbol, Painting and Architecture. Edited by Christopher R. Brewer and Robert MacSwain. London and New York: Routledge, 2017.
Brown, David. God and Mystery in Words: Experience through Metaphor and Drama. Oxford: Oxford University Press, 2008.
Brown, David. God and Grace of Body: Sacrament in Ordinary. Oxford: Oxford University Press, 2007.
Brown, David. God and Enchantment of Place: Reclaiming Human Experience. Oxford: Oxford University Press, 2004.
Burch Brown, Frank. Good Taste, Bad Taste, and Christian Taste: Aesthetics in Religious Life. London, New York: Oxford University Press, 2003.
Burch Brown, Frank. Religious Aesthetics: A Theological Study of Making and Meaning. Princeton, NJ: Princeton University Press, 1989.
Bustard, Ned. It Was Good: Making Art to the Glory of God. Baltimore, MD: Square Halo Books, 2000.
Cawkwell,Tim. The New Filmgoer's Guide to God. Leicester: Troubador Press 2014
Corby Finney, Paul, ed.. Seeing Beyond the Word: Visual Arts and the Calvinistic Tradition. Eerdmans, 1999.
Dagget Dillenberger, Jane. Style and Content in Christian Art. New York, Crossroad: 1965 (1986).
Deacy, Christopher. Screen Christologies: Redemption and the Medium of Film. Cardiff: University of Wales Press, 2001.
Dillenberger, John A Theology of Artistic Sensibilities: The Visual Arts and the Church. London: SCM Press, 1987.
Drury, John. Painting the Word: Christian Pictures and Their Meanings. Yale: Yale University Press, 1998.
Duquette, Natasha, Ed. Sublimer Aspects: Interfaces between Literature, Aesthetics, and Theology.  Cambridge: Cambridge Scholars Publishing, 2007.
Dyrness, William. Christian Art in Asia. Amsterdam:Rodopi,  1979.
Dyrness, William. Reformed Theology and Visual Culture: The Protestant Imagination from Calvin to Edwards. Cambridge: Cambridge University Press, 2004. 
Dyrness, William. Roualt: A Vision of Suffering and Salvation. Grand Rapids, MI: Eerdmans, 1971.
Dyrness, William. Senses of the Soul: Art and the Visual in Christian Worship. Eugene, OR: Cascade Books, 2008. 
Dyrness, William. Visual Faith: Art, Theology, and Worship in Dialogue. Grand Rapids, MI: Baker Academic, 2001.
Dyrness, William. Poetic Theology: God and the Poetics of Everyday Life. Grand Rapids, MI: Eerdmans, 2011. 
Evdokimov, Paul E. The Art of the Icon: A Theology of Beauty. Wheathampstead, Hertfordshire & Redondo Beach, California: Anthony Clarke Publishers & Oakwood Publications, 1990, . (French original: L'Art de l'Icône: Théologie de la Beauté. Paris, Desclée De Brouwer, 1972.)
Fiddes, Paul. Freedom and limit: a dialogue between literature and Christian doctrine (Basingstoke: Macmillan, 1991; Macon, Georgia: Mercer University Press, 1991)
Fiddes, Paul. The Novel, Spirituality, and Modern Culture. Cardiff: University of Wales Press, 2000.
Fiddes, Paul. The Promised End: Eschatology in Theology and Literature. Oxford: Blackwell, 2000.
Forde, Nigel. The Lantern and the Looking-Glass: Literature and Christian Belief. SPCK, 1997.
Gaebelein, Frank E. The Christian, the Arts, and Truth: Regaining a Vision of Greatness. Ed. Bruce Lockerbie. A Critical Concern Book. Portland, OR: Multnomah, 1985.
Garcia-Rivera, Alejandro. The Community of the Beautiful: A Theological Aesthetics. Collegeville, MN: The Liturgical Press, 1999.
Garcia-Rivera, Alejandro. A Wounded Innocence: Sketches for a Theology of Art. Collegeville, MN: The Liturgical Press, 2003.
Garcia-Rivera, Alejandro and Thomas Scirghi. Living Beauty: The Art of Liturgy. Lanham, MD: Rowman & Littlefield Publishers, Inc., 2008.
Gorringe, Timothy. The Education of Desire: Towards a Theology of the Senses. London: SCM, 2001.
Gorringe, Timothy. Furthering Humanity: A Theology of Culture. London: Ashgate, 2004.
Harries, Richard. Art and the Beauty of God: A Christian Understanding. London: Mowbray, 1993.
Harries, Richard. The Passion in Art. Aldershot: Ashgate, 2004.
Hurley, Neil P. Theology Through Film. New York: Harper & Row, 1970.
Jensen, Robin M. The Substance of Things Seen: Art Faith and the Christian Community. Grand Rapids, MI: Eerdmans, 2004.
Jewett, Robert. Saint Paul at the Movies: The Apostle’s Dialogue with American Culture. Louisville: Westminster/John Knox, 1993.
Jewett, Robert. Saint Paul Returns to the Movies: Triumph over Shame. Grand Rapids: Eerdmans, 1999.
Koehrsen, Jens. Religious Tastes and Styles as Markers of Class Belonging, in: Sociology 53(6), 2018, . 
Kandinsky, Wassily. Concerning the Spiritual in Art. New York: Dover Publications, 1977.
Kreitzer, Larry J. The New Testament in Fiction and Film: On Reversing the Hermeneutical Flow. Sheffield: JSOT Press, 1993.
Kreitzer, Larry J. The Old Testament in Fiction and Film: On Reversing the Hermeneutical Flow. Sheffield: JSOT Press, 1994.
Marsh, Clive, and Gae Ortiz, eds. Explorations in Theology and Film: Movies and Meaning. Oxford: Blackwell, 1997.
May, John R. Nourishing Faith through Fiction: Reflections on the Apostles’ Creed in Literature and Film. Franklin, Wisconsin: Sheed and Ward, 2001.
Murphy, Michael P. A Theology of Criticism: Balthasar, Postmodernism, and the Catholic Imagination. New York: Oxford University Press, 2008.
Niebuhr, H. Richard. Christ and Culture. New York: Harper & Row, 1951.
Power Erikson, Kathleen. At Eternity’s Gate: The Spiritual Vision of Vincent van Gogh. Grand Rapids, MI: Eerdmans, 1999.
Rookmaaker, Hans R. Art Needs No Justification. Downers Grove, IL: InterVarsity, 1978.
Rookmaaker, Hans R. The Creative Gift. Leicester: InterVarsity, 1981.
Rookmaaker, Hans R. Modern Art and the Death of A Culture. Downers Grove, IL: InterVarsity, 1970.
Ryken, Leland. The Christian Imagination: Essays on Literature and the Arts. Grand Rapids: Baker, 1981.
Ryken, Leland. The Liberated Imagination: Thinking Christianly about the Arts. The Wheaton Literary Series. Wheaton, IL: Harold Shaw, 1989.
Sayers, Dorothy L. The Mind of the Maker. Cleveland: World, 1956.
Schaeffer, Francis A. Art and the Bible. Downers Grove, IL: InterVarsity, 1973.
Schaeffer, Franky. Addicted to Mediocrity: 20th Century Christians and the Arts. Wheaton, IL: Crossway, 1985.
Seerveld, Calvin. Bearing Fresh Olive Leaves: Alternative Steps in Understanding Art. Carlisle, UK: Piquant Press, 2000.
Seerveld, Calvin. Rainbows for the Fallen World: Aesthetic Life and Artistic Task. Toronto, ON: Toronto Tuppence Press, 1980.
 Soldini, Jean. Saggio sulla discesa della bellezza. Linee per un'estetica. Milan: Jaca Book, 1995.
Tillich, Paul. On Art and Architecture. Ed. John Dillenberger and Jane Dillenberger. New York: Crossroad, 1987.
Treier, Daniel J., Mark Husbands, and Roger Lundin. The Beauty of God: Theology and the Arts. Downers Grove, IL: InterVarsity Press, 2007.
Veith, Gene Edward. State of the Arts: From Bezalel to Mapplethorpe. Turning Point Christian Worldview Series. Wheaton, IL: Crossway, 1991.
Viladesau, Richard. Theological Aesthetics: God in Imagination, Beauty, and Art. New York, Oxford: Oxford University Press, 1999.
Viladesau, Richard. Theology and the Arts: Encountering God through Music, Art, and Rhetoric. New York, Mahwah, NJ: Paulist Press, 2000.
Von Balthasar, Hans Urs. The Glory of the Lord: A Theological Aesthetics, vol. 1, Seeing the Form. Trans. Erasmo Leiva-Merikakis. Ed. Joseph Fessio, SJ and John Riches. Edinburgh: T & T Clark, 1982.
Wolfe, Gregory. Intruding Upon the Timeless: Meditations on Art, Faith, and Mystery. Baltimore: Square Halo Books, 2003.
Wolterstorff, Nicholas. Art in Action: Toward a Christian Aesthetic. Grand Rapids, MI: Eerdmans, 1980.
Wood, Robert E. Placing aesthetics: Reflections on the philosophical tradition. Athens, Ohio: Ohio University Press, 1999. . (Subject Index entries "God" and "Religion".)

External links
Brehm Center for Worship, Theology, and the Arts - at Fuller Theological Seminary
Center for the Arts, Religion, and Education - at the Graduate Theological Union
Center for Christian Study of Charlottesville
Christian Study Center of Gainesville
Damah Film Festival
Dominican School of Philosophy & Theology, Berkeley, CA
Journal of Religion and Popular Culture
Mars Hill Audio - NPR-like audio journal
Society for the Arts in Religious and Theological Studies - a professional academic society
Theology Through the Arts project - Directed by Jeremy Begbie
Theology and the Arts reading list - By Jeremy Begbie
Transforming Culture: A Vision for the Church and the Arts - A symposium for pastors, church leaders, and artists (April 1–3. 2008)
Veritasse Arts Society, Oxford
Holy Icons: Theology in Color
Christians in the Visual Arts

Aesthetics
Applied aesthetics